The London and Paris Conferences were two related conferences held in London and Paris during September–October 1954 to determine the status of West Germany. The talks concluded with the signing of the Paris Agreements (Paris Pacts, or Paris Accords), which granted West Germany some sovereignty, ended the occupation, and allowed its admittance to NATO. Furthermore, both West Germany and Italy joined the Brussels Treaty on 23 October 1954. The Agreements went into force on 5 May 1955. The participating powers included France, the United Kingdom, Belgium, the Netherlands, Luxembourg, West Germany, Italy, Canada, the United States, and remaining NATO members.

Prelude
Since the end of World War II, West Germany had been occupied by Allied forces and lacked its own means of defense. On 23 July 1952, the European Coal and Steel Community came into existence, bonding the member states economically. By 1951, fear of possible Soviet aggression in Europe led to preparation of an ill-fated European Defense Community (EDC). EDC was a proposed joint Western European military force, at the time favored over admitting Germany to NATO.  The General Treaty of 1952 formally named the EDC as a prerequisite of the end of Allied occupation of Germany. EDC was, however, rejected by the French National Assembly on August 30, 1954, and a new solution became necessary.

London
At the London Conference, often called the Nine-Power Conference (not to be confused with the Nine Power Treaty), it was agreed that the occupying powers would make every effort to end the occupation.  The limits of German re-armament were also very important especially to France, which was still concerned with a powerful Germany.

Belgium was represented by Paul-Henri Spaak, Canada by Lester B. Pearson, France by Pierre Mendès-France, Germany by Konrad Adenauer, Italy by Gaetano Martino, Luxembourg by Joseph Bech, the Netherlands by Jan Willem Beyen, the United Kingdom by Anthony Eden, and the United States by John Foster Dulles.

Paris
The powers met again in Paris on October 20–23, in an intergovernmental conference followed by a NATO Council meeting, to put the decisions reached in London into formal declarations and protocols to existing treaties.   "Protocol No. I Modifying and Completing the Brussels Treaty" formally added West Germany and Italy to the Brussels Treaty, creating the Western European Union (WEU), which, while not as broad or powerful as the previously proposed EDC, nevertheless was sufficient for the Deutschlandvertrag to come into force and therefore to end the occupation of West Germany and admit it as an ally in the Cold War.

Altogether there were as many as twelve international agreements signed in Paris. Protocol No. II committed the United Kingdom to maintain four divisions and the Second Tactical Air Force in Europe.

The Bonn–Paris conventions ended the occupation of West Germany and West Germany obtained "the full authority of a sovereign state" on 5 May 1955 (although "full sovereignty" was not obtained until the Two Plus Four Agreement in 1990).{{refn |name=Sovereignty |group=lower-alpha |Detlef Junker of the Ruprecht-Karls-Universität Heidelberg states "In the October 23, 1954, Paris Agreements, Adenauer pushed through the following laconic wording: 'The Federal Republic shall accordingly [after termination of the occupation regime] have the full authority of a sovereign state over its internal and external affairs.' If this was intended as a statement of fact, it must be conceded that it was partly fiction and, if interpreted as wishful thinking, it was a promise that went unfulfilled until 1990. The Allies maintained their rights and responsibilities regarding Berlin and Germany as a whole, particularly the responsibility for future reunification and a future peace treaty".<ref>Detlef Junker (editor), Translated by Sally E. Robertson, The United States and Germany in the Era of the Cold War, A Handbook Volume 1, 1945–1968 Series: Publications of the German Historical Institute . See Section "THE PRESENCE OF THE PAST" paragraph 9.</ref>}} The treaty allowed Allied troops to remain in the country.

An agreement expanded the Brussels Treaty of 1948 to include West Germany and Italy, creating the Western European Union.  This agreement allowed West Germany to start a limited rearmament program though it banned development of certain weapons, such as large warships.  It was signed by the Brussels Treaty countries (Belgium, France, Great Britain, Luxembourg, and the Netherlands) and by West Germany and Italy.

Another accord accepted West Germany into the North Atlantic Treaty Organization (NATO).

Saar status
The negotiations on Saar status, only between France and West Germany, were held on the night before the conference, on 19 October. The territory had been essentially annexed by France after the war as a "protectorate" in an economic, customs and monetary union with France and with a government subordinate to a High Commissioner appointed by the French government.  West Germany was keen to prevent further integration of the Saar with France and reincorporate the region into West Germany.  France and West Germany negotiated an agreement under which the Saar would become a "European territory" and remain economically tied to France, but required a referendum of Saar residents on the new proposal.  The 1955 Saar Statute referendum took place on October 23, 1955 and residents rejected the Paris Agreement proposal by 2-1.  This was taken as a sign that residents preferred reunion with Germany. On 27 October 1956 the Saar Treaty officially made Saarland a state of the Federal Republic of Germany.

See also

References

External links
 Final Act of the London Conference Full text. 
  Declaration Inviting Italy and the Federal Republic of Germany to Accede to the Brussels Treaty, October 23, 1954 Full text.
  Protocol No. I (and Annex) Modifying and Completing the Brussels Treaty, October 23, 1954 Full text.
  Protocol No. II on Forces of Western European Union, October 23, 1954 Full text.
  Protocol No. III (and Annexes) on the Control of Armaments, October 23, 1954 Full text.
  Protocol No. IV on the Agency of Western European Union for the Control of Armaments, October 23, 1954 Full text.
NATO on the Paris Agreements

1. Protocol 1. on the Termination of the Occupation Regime in the Federal Republic of Germany
2. Resume of the Five Schedules Attached to the Protocol on the Termination of the Occupation Regime
Declaration of the Federal Republic on Aid to Berlin
Convention on the presence of Foreign Forces in the Federal Republic of Germany
5. Three-Power Declaration on Berlin

 1. Declaration inviting Italy and the Federal Republic of Germany to accede to the Brussels Treaty
 2. Protocol modifying and completing the Brussels Treaty
 Protocol No. II on Forces of Western European Union
 Protocol No. III on the Control of Armaments
 Protocol No. IV on the Agency of Western European Union for the Control of Armaments
 3. Letters with reference to the jurisdiction of the International Court of Justice from, respectively, the Governments of the Federal Republic and of Italy to the other Governments signatory of the Protocol Modifying and Completing the Brussels Treaty
  Reply to the Letters from the Governments of the Federal Republic and of Italy to the Other Governments Signatory of the Protocol Modifying and Completing  the Brussels Treaty
  4. Resolution on Production and Standardization of Armaments (Adopted by the Nine-Power Conference on 21sl October, 1954)

1 Resolution to Implement Section IV of the Final Act of the London Conference
2. Resolution of Association 
 Declaration by the Government of the Federal Republic of Germany 
Declaration by the Governments of United States of America, United Kingdom and France 
3. Protocol to the North Atlantic Treaty on the Accession of the Federal Republic of Germany
4 Resolution on Hesulis of the Four and Nine Power Meetings (Adopted by the North Atlantic Council on 22nd October 1954)
Final Act of the London Conference (October 3rd)
Federal Chancellor's List — Declaration by the Powers 
British Statement 
Canadian Affirmation 
German Membership of NATO — Powers' Recommendation 
Principles of UN Charter — German Acceptance 
Declaration by the German Federal Republic
Declaration by the Governments of U.S.A., U.K. and France 
European Unity — Close Association of Britain 
Annex 1. Draft Declaration and Draft Protocol Inviting Italy and the German Federal Republic to Accede to the Brussels Treaty''

September 1954 events in Europe
October 1954 events in Europe
Allied occupation of Germany
History of the European Union
1954 in France
History of Paris
Treaties of the French Fourth Republic
1954 in London
1954 in Europe
Diplomatic conferences in France
Diplomatic conferences in the United Kingdom
20th century in Paris
20th-century diplomatic conferences
Western European Union
1954 in international relations
1954 in the European Economic Community
Conferences in London
Conferences in Paris
1954 conferences
Declarations of the European Union
Anthony Eden